Silvio Fazio (April 9, 1952-) is an Italian writer. He was born in Rome, Italy.

Biography
Fazio graduated from accounting at the Institute Sandro Botticelli in Rome. He left Italy in 1977 to live in Nice, France. Before leaving Italy, being attracted by the animals of the savannah, he has participated to the inauguration of the Safari Park in Rome where he will take care of 40 lions in semi-freedom. Fazio was the union representative for Force Ouvrière, from 2002 to 2010. In 2002 he signed the agreement for a reduction in working hours for two hotels on the French Riviera.

In 2006, Silvio Fazio published his first science fiction novel: Il Segreto della grande porta. In 2010 he wrote the biography of Richard Ramirez, the Night Stalker, Il Profeta di Satana. In 2012, the author released Où les Dieux vont mourir (French), that challenges the official interpretation given by the FBI after the massacre at Columbine High School and in two documentary films, Bowling for Columbine (Michael Moore) and Elephant (Gus Van Sant).
The author doesn’t like the society gossip column and he declines any International Book Fair that he considers not-literary conventions. Fazio wrote some shorts novels for anthologies for Perrone Publisher and, sometimes, he use pseudonyms. He wrote, also, articles for the Italian web log: Fronte della Comunicazione.

Published works

Fiction

Shorts Novels for Giulio Perrone Publisher 
 2008 : La vita che vorrei      pseudonym Silvio Rotti
 2008 : Vivo per lei           
 2009 : Sono nato un 9 aprile   pseudonym Fabrizio Spampinato
 2009 : Lester                  pseudonym Claudio Nasica
 2009 : L'Isola del peccato     pseudonym Massimo Russaiolo
 2009 : La carezza del male    
 2009 : La Bussola             
 2009 : Io un superbo?         pseudonym Elena Spampinato

References

External links
 Historical archives of the Botticelli school. 
 
 Web article for the book Il Profeta di Satana 
 Article Voila.com about the Author
 Google Books
 Best Book of the Month. By Stefano Donno
 Review Mangialibri

Living people
1952 births
Italian male writers
Writers from Rome